Matej Marković (born 22 July 1996) is a Croatian professional footballer who plays as a goalkeeper for Greek Super League club Levadiakos.

Honours
Sarajevo
Bosnian Premier League: 2019–20
Levadiakos
Super League 2: 2021–22

References

External links

1996 births
Living people
Footballers from Zagreb
Association football goalkeepers
Bosnia and Herzegovina footballers
NK Zagreb players
NK Rudeš players
NK HAŠK players
NK Čelik Zenica players
FK Krupa players
FK Sarajevo players
MFK Zemplín Michalovce players
Levadiakos F.C. players
First Football League (Croatia) players
Premier League of Bosnia and Herzegovina players
Slovak Super Liga players
Super League Greece 2 players
Super League Greece players
Bosnia and Herzegovina expatriate footballers
Expatriate footballers in Croatia
Bosnia and Herzegovina expatriate sportspeople in Croatia
Expatriate footballers in Slovakia
Bosnia and Herzegovina expatriate sportspeople in Slovakia
Expatriate footballers in Greece
Bosnia and Herzegovina expatriate sportspeople in Greece